Dagger Eyes is a 1983 Italian thriller film directed by Carlo Vanzina, starring Carole Bouquet as Mystère.

Plot
Mystère is a high-class French prostitute who works in Rome. Her friend and colleague Pamela steals a gold lighter from a German customer and hides it in her purse. The German and Pamela are mysteriously killed in rapid succession and Mystère is saved from an aggression only by the prompt intervention of Inspector Colt. Mystère and Colt come to a subtle understanding that will allow the pair to come to the fore of the international intrigue in which they find themselves involved.

The German was in fact a photographer who had taken very compromising shots of an attack by the Soviet secret services on an American office in Piazza di Spagna where a politician was assassinated. The microfilm from the camera was hidden in the lighter that ended up in Mystère's possession. Mystère discovers that her friend's killer, the photographer, is the head of Criminalpol, and manages to save Colt from them. Colt then kills his boss and decides to deal directly with the secret services to be able to obtain a large sum for the film and escape to make a new life with Mystère.

An adventurous succession of events allows the inspector obtain a million dollars, but the initial plan changes and Mystère is left behind. Mystère finds Colt in his golden exile in Hong Kong and instead of taking revenge, the couple fall in love. Not even the return of a secret agent, after the money from the film, spoils the new life they have made.

Cast

Production
Dagger Eyes was inspired by Jean-Jacques Beineix's Diva (1981), with screenwriter Enrico Vanzina recalling that him and his brother Carlo Vanzina "gave priority to images" for the film. 

The ending of the film set in Hong Kong was forced on the Vanzina brothers by producer Goffredo Lombardo.

Release
Dagger Eyes was released in 1983. It was distributed theatrically by  Titanus. It was released on home video in a dubbed format the United States as Dagger Eyes by Vista Home Video. Roberto Curti stated the film had "good commercial results" leading to the Vanzina brothers to develop Nothing Underneath.

Reception
From retrospective reviews, in his book Italian Giallo in Film and Television, film critic and historian Roberto Curti stated that the film was a "competent but hollow genre product" finding it was marred by a dull male lead and a bad ending.

References

Sources

External links
 
 

1983 films
1983 thriller films
Films about prostitution in Italy
Films directed by Carlo Vanzina
Films scored by Armando Trovajoli
Films set in Hong Kong
Films set in Rome
Films shot in Rome
Giallo films
Italian thriller films
1980s Italian-language films
1980s Italian films